Hāwera is the second-largest centre in the Taranaki region of New Zealand's North Island, with a population of . It is near the coast of the South Taranaki Bight. The origins of the town lie in a government military base that was established in 1866, and the town of Hāwera grew up around a blockhouse in the early 1870s.

Hāwera is 75 kilometres south of New Plymouth on State Highway 3 and 30 minutes' drive from Mount Taranaki. It is located on State Highway 45, known as Surf Highway 45 for its numerous surf beaches. State Highway 45 passes through Manaia, Ōpunake and Oakura en route to New Plymouth. Kaponga is a 20-minute drive to the north-west. The Marton–New Plymouth Line railway passes through Hāwera and has served the town since 1 August 1881, though it has been freight-only since the cancellation of the last railcar passenger service between Wellington and New Plymouth on 30 July 1977.

History

Pre-European history

The Māori-language name  means "burnt place"; it arose as a result of fighting between two local sub-tribes, which culminated in the setting ablaze of the sleeping whare (house) of the tribe under attack. Spelled "Hawera" for most of its European history, a macron was added to the official name by the New Zealand Geographic Board in June 2019.

European settlement

The town's name meaning "burnt place" became apt when the town suffered extensive blazes in 1884, 1888, and 1912.

For this reason a large water tower was built in the centre of town to increase water pressure; and this became one of Taranaki's best-known landmarks (appearing, for example, on the cover of the 1974 telephone directory). After falling into disrepair the tower was closed to the public in 2001, but after an extensive restoration program it opened again in 2004.

Marae

There are four marae in the Hāwera area:

 Ngātiki Pa, is affiliated with Taanga’oe Hapū of Hāmua and  Hawe.
 Te Rangatapu Marae and its Aorangi meeting house are affiliated with the Ngāruahine hapū of Kanihi-Umutahi and Ōkahu-Inuāwai.
 Taiporohēnui Marae and its Whareroa meeting house are affiliated with the Ngāti Ruanui hapū of Hāmua and Hāpōtiki.
 Wharepuni Marae and its Tūpaia meeting house are affiliated with the Ngāti Ruanui hapū of Ngāti Tānewai and Ngāti Tūpaea.

In October 2020, the Government committed $1,479,479 from the Provincial Growth Fund to renovate Meremere Marae, Ketemarae Pā, Pariroa Marae and Taiporohēnui Marae, creating 35 jobs.

Demography 

There were 3,816 households. There were 4,770 males and 5,025 females, giving a sex ratio of 0.95 males per female, with 2,043 people (20.9%) aged under 15 years, 1,767 (18.0%) aged 15 to 29, 4,071 (41.6%) aged 30 to 64, and 1,908 (19.5%) aged 65 or older.

Ethnicities were 78.8% European/Pākehā, 27.5% Māori, 1.9% Pacific peoples, 5.0% Asian, and 2.1% other ethnicities (totals add to more than 100% since people could identify with multiple ethnicities).

The proportion of people born overseas was 10.6%, compared with 27.1% nationally.

Although some people objected to giving their religion, 49.0% had no religion, 37.7% were Christian, 1.3% were Hindu, 0.6% were Muslim, 0.2% were Buddhist and 3.6% had other religions.

Of those at least 15 years old, 714 (9.2%) people had a bachelor or higher degree, and 2,208 (28.5%) people had no formal qualifications. The employment status of those at least 15 was that 3,621 (46.7%) people were employed full-time, 996 (12.9%) were part-time, and 378 (4.9%) were unemployed.

Economy

The Whareroa dairy factory, 4 km south-southwest of the township, is the largest dairy complex in the world in terms of output. The complex is owned by Fonterra, having been built by the former Kiwi Co-operative Dairies, whose original plant opened on that site in 1975.

During peak season, the complex employs 1,000 people and processes up to 14 million litres of milk per day. Electricity and heat used at Whareroa is generated by an on-site gas-fired power plant, with excess electricity fed into the national grid.

Hāwera is home to Tawhiti Museum, well known for its hand-crafted life-sized mannequins depicting scenes of local heritage and history, and its scale models of local Māori pā.

Education

Hāwera Primary School was established in 1875. It developed into a District High School in 1901. The current high school opened as Hāwera Technical High School in 1919, and moved to its present site in 1921. The intermediate school opened in 1961.

The Western Institute of Technology at Taranaki has a campus in Hāwera, established in 1990.

The two schools will close and be replaced by a new school for years 7–13 in 2023.

Hāwera Primary celebrated its 125th jubilee in 2000. Ramanui school celebrated its 50th jubilee in 2003.

It is a Kura Kaupapa Māori school which teaches in the Māori language.

All these schools are coeducational. Rolls are as of 

In October 2021, it was announced that Hāwera High School and Hāwera Intermediate will be closing at the end of 2022. A new, years 7–13 school will be created on the current Hāwera High School campus at the beginning of 2023.

Politics 
Hāwera is in the South Taranaki district. After serving four terms as mayor of South Taranaki, Ross Dunlop did not stand in the 2019 election, and was replaced as mayor by District Councillor Phil Nixon.

Notable people 

 Aroha Awarau, journalist
 Michael Bent, rugby player
 Pat Booth, investigative journalist
 Cameron Brewer, Auckland councillor
 Alan Brough, actor and comedian
 Gayle Broughton, rugby union player
 Michael Campbell, professional golfer
 Tim Chadwick, artist and author
 Geoffrey Duncan Chisholm, surgeon
 Ben Hurley, comedian and cricket commentator
 Peter Ingram, cricket player
 Fiona Kidman, writer
 Issac Luke, rugby league player
 John Gildroy Grant, World War I Victoria Cross recipient
 Wayne Gould, populariser of sudoku
 Nicola Kawana, actress
 John Mitchell, rugby union player and coach
 Ronald Hugh Morrieson, author
 Alan Stuart Paterson, cartoonist
 John Plumtree, rugby union player and coach
 Conrad Smith, All Black rugby union player
 Elijah Taylor, rugby league player
 Adine Wilson, Silver Ferns netballer
 Debbie Ngarewa-Packer, Māori Party member of parliament

References

External links

 Hāwera information page from the South Taranaki District Council

South Taranaki District
Populated places in Taranaki